Joseph Melville Broughton Jr. (November 17, 1888March 6, 1949) was an American politician who served as the 60th governor of North Carolina from 1941 to 1945.  He later briefly served as a United States Senator from January 3, 1949 until his death in office approximately two months later.

Early life and education
Broughton was born on November 17, 1888 in Raleigh, North Carolina. He graduated from Wake Forest College, where he also played football, in 1910. Broughton attended Harvard Law School then worked as a school principal and journalist before actively entering the legal profession.

Political career
He served in the North Carolina Senate from 1927 to 1929. He later served one term as governor from 1941 to 1945. One of his major legacies was the extension of the public school term from six to nine months.

Broughton was among twelve nominated at the 1944 Democratic National Convention to serve as Franklin D. Roosevelt's running mate in the presidential election that year.

Tenure in Senate
In 1948, Broughton was elected to the United States Senate, after defeating William B. Umstead, an appointed incumbent, in the Democratic primary. In November, Broughton won both a special election to complete the Senate term and an election for a full term. He took office on December 31, 1948, but his service in the Senate was brief.

Appearing healthy, Broughton suddenly collapsed from a heart attack and died in Washington D.C. on March 6, 1949. Governor W. Kerr Scott appointed Frank Porter Graham to fill his vacant office until the next election.

Family

Joseph Melville Broughton, Jr. was  the son of Joseph Melville Broughton and Sallie Harris. He married Alice Willson in 1916, they had four children. He was the nephew of Needham B. Broughton and a first cousin of Carrie Lougee Broughton. He was also a first cousin of medical doctor and Baptist minister Len G. Broughton. Broughton and his wife lived in the Jolly-Broughton House, a Georgian Revival mansion located in Raleigh's Hayes Barton Historic District, before and after living in the North Carolina Executive Mansion. He was interred at Montlawn Memorial Park in Raleigh.

Legacy
In 1959, the State Hospital at Morganton for psychiatric patients was renamed Broughton Hospital in his memory.  In addition, Broughton Hall at North Carolina State University was named in his honor.

He was a member of Civitan International.

See also
 List of United States Congress members who died in office (1900–49)

References

Works cited 
  - View profile at Google Books

External links
 at Biographical Directory of the United States Congress
National Governors Association biography
North Carolina Historical Marker 
NCPedia - Joseph Melville Broughton

Democratic Party governors of North Carolina
Harvard Law School alumni
1944 United States vice-presidential candidates
Wake Forest University alumni
1888 births
1949 deaths
Democratic Party United States senators from North Carolina
Joseph
Democratic Party North Carolina state senators
Politicians from Raleigh, North Carolina
20th-century American politicians